Domenico Galeazzi (Bologna, 20 May 1647 – Bologna, 9 April 1731) was an Italian painter.

Biography
He was the son of Tommaso Galeazzi in Bologna. He trained under Carlo Cignani.  He painted the main altarpiece for the church of Sant'Omobono. He also painted an altarpiece of St Francis in Prayer. He married Bianca Bulbarini of Reggio Emilia in 1682; she had nine children with him, among them Domenico Maria Gusmano Galeazzi, who became a doctor of philosophy and medicine. Domenico Maria Gusmano was the father of Lucia Galeazzi Galvani.

Domenico was buried in the church of the Madonna di Galliera, Bologna.

References

1647 births
1731 deaths
17th-century Italian painters
Italian male painters
18th-century Italian painters
Painters from Florence
18th-century Italian male artists